Homey D. Clown is a 1993 video game published by Capstone Software and developed by Synergistic Software for DOS.

Gameplay
Homey D. Clown is based on the character Homey D. Clown from In Living Color.

Publication history
One of the most popular characters in the show's history, Homey was the only In Living Color character to get his own video game.

Reception
In 1996, Computer Gaming World declared Homey D. Clown the 5th-worst computer game ever released. In 2020, commenting on its inclusion in the speedrunning charity event Summer Games Done Quick, Ars Technica described the game's music and sound effects as "easily some of the worst ever committed to a hard drive".

Reviews
PC Games (Jan, 1994)
Questbusters
PCMania
Electronic Games

References

1993 video games
Action-adventure games
DOS games
DOS-only games
Single-player video games
Synergistic Software games
Video games about clowns
Video games based on television series
Video games developed in the United States